Scott Easthope (born 15 October 1985) is a New Zealand football manager who manages the Samoa national team.

Managerial Statistics

References

1985 births
Living people
New Zealand association football coaches
Samoa national football team managers